TLF may refer to:

TLF (band), French rap band
TLF Apparel, American clothing brand
Telefol language, a Papua New Guinean language
Terry L. Fossum; Winner, Kicking & Screaming, Season 1 on Fox

Abbreviations
Timing Library Format, a type of text file
Trésor de la langue française, a French dictionary
The Little Foundation
True Love Forever (see Jay's jacket from Clerks 2)
Tigrayan Liberation Front of Ethiopia
Text Layout Framework, a software library within Adobe Flex
Total Life Forever, an album by the British band Foals

TlF can mean
Thallium fluoride